Tatev refers to the Tatev monastery (Տաթևի վանք) 

Tatev may also refer to:
Tatev (village) (Տաթև) is a village and rural community in the Syunik Province of Armenia, home to the Tatev monastery
Wings of Tatev (Տաթևի թևեր. Tatevi tever) cableway between Halidzor and the Tatev monastery
Tatev Hydroelectric Power Station near the village of Tatev

People
Tatev Abrahamyan (1988) Armenian born U.S. women's chess player
Tatev Chakhian, Armenian poet, artist, editor and translator
Gregory of Tatev, Armenian philosopher, theologian and a saint in the Armenian Apostolic Church